Apriona elsa is a species of beetle in the family Cerambycidae. It was described by Kriesche in 1919. It is known from Malaysia, Java and Sumatra.

References

Batocerini
Beetles described in 1919